Ahmer Bilal Soofi is a Pakistani lawyer and former caretaker minister. He was the Minister of Law, Justice, Parliamentary Affairs and Human Rights in Khoso caretaker ministry in 2013.

Career 
He is the founding President of the Research Society of International Law and the Senior Partner of the well-reputed law firm ABS&Co with offices in Lahore and Islamabad. He served as the Federal Minister for Law and Justice, Parliamentary Affairs and Human Rights, in the caretaker government in 2013. He has appeared before the High Courts and the Supreme Court of Pakistan in over 1,000 cases. He is also a life-long member of the Supreme Court Bar Association of Pakistan. He was elected as a member of the Advisory Committee to the United Nations Human Rights Council and the Vice-President of its Asia-Pacific group for three years in 2011.

References

Living people
Pakistani lawyers
Federal ministers of Pakistan
Punjab University Law College alumni
Government College University, Lahore alumni
Alumni of the University of Cambridge
1962 births